Karl Hinds, also known as R.A.W, is a British rapper and producer, and founder of the record label Assassin Records.

Career
Hinds' first single was "Roughneck Sister Sue", released in 1993 under the name of R.A.W. The track found some underground success but was not financially profitable for the label. Subsequent singles included "Cock Out & Ride" and "Feelin (Gal A Fuss)/Zero", and by the time Hinds had produced and released his fourth single, the label had been established as a drum & bass record label. Hinds subsequently released 20 singles through Assassin Records, all under different aliases.

In 2000, Hinds's record "Don Gramma" was nominated for Best Newcomer and Best Single 2001, and won the award for Best Video of the year in the UKHH Awards. Hinds then opened a sister label, Ill Flava Records, focusing on hip hop. Ill Flava released its first album in 2002, Hinds's debut LP Hindsight, which featured Blak Twang, Estelle, Wildflower, and Seanie T. 

After touring the UK for two years, Hinds toured Europe in 2003 with German producer DJ Dynamite. In 2004, he released his second album Have Patience, from which the most successful single was "Lets Av It" featuring Skinnyman.

Awards

UKHH Awards
2001, Best Hip Hop Video - "Don Gramma" (Winner)
2001, Best Single - "Don Gramma" (Nominated)
2001, Best Newcomer - Karl Hinds (Nominated)
2003, Best Single - "Get To Know Me" (Nominated)

Discography

Videography

References

External links
Ill Flava Records website

Living people
Black British male rappers
English male rappers
People from Ilford
Rappers from London
Year of birth missing (living people)
Place of birth missing (living people)